Mia's Math Adventure: Just in Time! is the third title of the Mia's Big Adventure Collection software series created by Kutoka Interactive. Released in 2001 in Canada and the United States, the game teaches mathematics to children between 6 and 10 years old.

Adventure
Mia must travel back in time to prevent a terrible fire that has consumed her house. After helping Marty gather the parts to build a time-travelling machine, she returns in the past in order to discover the cause of the fire and prevent it from ever happening.

Activities
The game's 12 educational activities teach arithmetic (addition, subtraction, multiplication and division) geometry (circle, square, rectangle, triangle, closed and broken lines) logic, place value, fractions, measures, etc.

Critical reception
Mia's Math Adventure received positive reviews from the National Parenting Center, USA Today, MacAddict, ReviewCorner.com, Maccentral.com, Houston Chronicle, Chicago Parent, and Los Angeles Times.

Reception

The game received several awards from various organizations such as Parents' Choice, National Parenting Center, Coalition for Quality Children's Media and iParenting Media Award.

Notes

External links
Mia's Math Adventure at Kutoka.com

2001 video games
Mia series
Classic Mac OS games
Video games developed in Canada
Windows games
Children's educational video games
Mathematical education video games
Video games about mice and rats